Kabul Express is a 2006 Indian Hindi-language adventure thriller film written and directed by documentary film maker Kabir Khan and produced by Aditya Chopra under Yash Raj Films was released on 15 December 2006. The film stars John Abraham, Arshad Warsi, Salman Shahid, Hanif Humgaam and Linda Arsenio. Kabul Express is the first fictional film for director Kabir Khan who has made several documentaries over the years in Afghanistan. According to him Kabul Express is loosely based on his and his friend Rajan Kapoor's experiences in post-Taliban Afghanistan. Kabul Express was shot entirely in Afghanistan.

Plot
Suhel Khan (John Abraham) and Jai Kapoor (Arshad Warsi) are Indian journalists working for Star News who are sent into Afghanistan to create a report on what life is like in the country following the US-led invasion of the country in September 2001. The two are shocked at the state of the country and the ruins that remain due to years of rule by the Taliban Regime. They take a tour of the country in a taxi, starting in Kabul. This follows an escape from capture by the Taliban.

On the way, they stop in the village of Ishtar along with the taxi driver Khyber (Hanif Humghum), who has watched his country fall apart over the decades. They stop in a small cafe selling kebabs where they meet American journalist Jessica Beckham (Linda Arsenio) who is working for Reuters in reporting on the US side of the Afghan war. Suhel and Jai then invite Jessica to join them on their tour of the country, which she does. However, shortly after leaving Ishtar, they are caught by Taliban official Imran Khan (Salman Shahid) who has hitched a ride at the back of the taxi in disguise as an Afghan woman. Imran demands they listen to him and travel straight to the Afghan border with Pakistan or he promises they will be killed. Imran is attempting to cross the border, get past Pakistani troops and negotiate with his Taliban associates in Pakistan.

The four travel through various villages where they see horrific sights of poverty before reaching the southern city of Kandahar where Jessica gets the chance to interview US troops who are fighting to regain control of the city from the Taliban who occupy the area. In the meantime, Suhel and Jai attempt to interview Imran, yet are unsuccessful when Imran threatens to shoot them. Once leaving Kandahar they travel through a farm and manage to capture a bullfight on film before stopping off at a stream coming closer to the Pakistan border. While Imran and the rest are out exploring, Jessica discovers Imran's passport is a Pakistani passport. She discovers that he was not originally a Taliban, but in fact a member of the Pakistani army named Wassim Chaudrey sent to Afghanistan to support the Mujahadeen rebels in their war against USSR back in the 1980s before he settled down in the country as a member of the Taliban Regime. When Imran discovers the break-in, he takes Suhel, Khyber and Jessica hostage and forces them to continue the journey to the Pakistan border. At one point, Imran abandons them for hours when he hears a noise. Gunshots are fired and the three travellers discover Imran to have met 10 US soldiers who attempted to kill him. With Imran distracted, Suhel grabs a gun from one of the soldiers and points it at Imran threatening to kill him if he doesn't respond in his interview. They leave Imran at the side of the road and start their journey back to Kabul. However, they are stopped in their path when Imran manages to leap into the taxi and demands they continue their journey to the border. They soon arrive at the border where Imran bids them farewell. On the way, they stop at the village where Imran lived and Imran meets his long lost wife and daughter Zoya. But before Imran can reach anywhere, he and the rest of them are attacked by the Mujahideen. Imran tells Suhel, Jessica, Khyber, and Jai to go while he uses his fighting skills to fight them off. Imran later travels on his own to the border and tries to persuade Pakistani troops to allow him entry into the country and that he is a Pakistani. However, they do not listen and Imran is shot on the border by the troops.

Cast
 John Abraham as Suhel Khan, an Indian TV journalist and director
 Arshad Warsi as Jai Kapoor, an Indian TV journalist and cinematographer
 Salman Shahid as Imran Khan Afridi, a Pakistani and Taliban soldier
 Hanif Humgaam as Khyber, an Afghan driver and guide
 Linda Arsenio as Jessica Beckham, a journalist from New York

Production 
Kabul Express was the first international film to be shot in the country following the fall of the Taliban regime and the first Hindi film since 1992's Khuda Gawah. The film was shot over 45 days in and around Kabul beginning in September 2005, around the time of a surge in Taliban insurgent violence. The insurgents also sent death threats to the film crew; the Afghan government protected the shootings by providing armed commandos and vehicles.

Critical reception
The film has received mixed-to-positive reviews, with most reviewers stating that the film is far away from real war reportage.

Box office
The film opened to a good response. According to Box Office India, Kabul Express grossed  in India. As of February 2007, the film grossed $4,523,110 at the Indian box office, $53,104 and $212,617 from Australian and British box offices respectively for a worldwide total of $5,091,289.

Awards
• 54th National Film Awards:
 * Indira Gandhi Award for Best Debut Film of a Director for Kabir Khan

 Asian Festival of First Films:
 Best Director – Kabir Khan
 Critics Award for Best Film – Foreign Correspondents Association Purple Orchid Award
 RECOGNITIONS
31st Toronto International Film Festival (World Premiere)
11th Pusan International Film Festival (Asia Premiere)
50th London International Film Festival (UK Premiere)
3rd Dubai International Film Festival (UAE Premiere)
3rd Casablanca International Film Festival
31st Cairo International Film Festival

Controversy
On 6 January 2007 the government of Afghanistan, who had fully supported the shooting of the film in the country, banned the movie despite it not having been officially released there. The banning by the Afghan Ministry of Culture followed protests over the film's allegedly racist portrayal of the ethnic Hazara Shia minority, one of the four largest ethnicities in Afghanistan, who have suffered greatly under the Taliban's oppressive rule. Hazaras are described in the film by an Afghan member of the crew and the "Pakistani Talib" as "worse than the Taliban", "bandits", "dangerous", and "savages", which led to the public outcry by the community.

On 5 January 2007, in a large gathering in Kabul, people of Kabul denounced the film as "an insult to all the people of Afghanistan". In the gathering one speaker said that after decades of internecine conflict when all ethnic groups of Afghanistan were working towards building a fraternal peace in the country, such provocations should not be allowed to derail those efforts. The gathering was reported to have been peaceful with the organizers determined to follow the legal course of action to seek redress through the governments of India and Afghanistan. Many people were adamant over Afghan Film's role in making the movie and expect that the Afghan organisation should not have let the remarks pass. The Afghan actor responsible for the allegedly racist remarks has reportedly apologised, as has the Indian director of the movie Kabir Khan.

On 14 January 2007, a demonstration was held in the Pakistani city of Quetta, where a large number of Hazara Shia reside. They demanded an apology from the director and a complete ban on the movie because the (Hazara Shia) had been offended and hurt by the movie.

Soundtrack

The album featuring 9 tracks including three remix and two instrumental. All tracks were composed by Raghav Sachar, one instrumental was composed by Julius Packiam. Lyrics were penned by Aditya Dhar, Swaratmika Mishra and Vijay Kumar.

The film score was composed by Julius Packiam.

See also
List of cultural references to the September 11 attacks

References

External links
 
 
 
 Kabul Express to be screened at Casablanca film festival

2006 films
Films scored by Raghav Sachar
2000s Hindi-language films
Indian adventure thriller films
Films about terrorism in Asia
Films set in Afghanistan
Hazara people-related films
Yash Raj Films films
India–Pakistan relations in popular culture
2000s adventure thriller films
Indian road movies
Best Debut Feature Film of a Director National Film Award winners
Military of Pakistan in films
2006 directorial debut films
Films directed by Kabir Khan
Films shot in Afghanistan